No Smoking is a 2007 Indian Hindi-language thriller film written and directed by Anurag Kashyap and co-produced by Vishal Bhardwaj and Kumar Mangat. The film stars John Abraham, Ayesha Takia, Ranvir Shorey and Paresh Rawal in the lead roles, while Bipasha Basu appears in an Item number. The film is loosely based upon the 1978 short story "Quitters, Inc." by Stephen King, which was previously adapted as one of three segments featured in Hollywood anthology film, Cat's Eye (1985). It became the second Indian film after Julie Ganapathi and first Hindi-language film to be adapted from a Stephen King's work. The story follows K (Abraham), a self-obsessed, narcissist chain smoker who agrees to kick his habit to save his marriage and visits a rehabilitation centre, but is caught in a labyrinth game by Baba Bengali (Rawal), the man who guarantees he will make him quit.

The film released worldwide on 26 October 2007, but was met with a lukewarm response from Indian critics and mixed response from overseas critics. The film did not perform well at the box office either, becoming one of the major disasters of the year. According to Kashyap, the film failed because, it was considered much ahead of its time, courtesy of its dark and unusual storyline comprising with elements of surrealism, fantasy, dream, reality, horror and dark humour which left critics and the cinema-goers baffled, this was frowned upon by Indian audiences, as it was unconventional, pretentious and they had never seen anything like it. But in later years, the film received positive reviews and has become a cult film.

No Smoking was nominated at several award ceremonies in 2008, primarily for the technical aspects of the film, including three Filmfare Award nominations. Before a full cinematic release in India, the film was invited to be screened at the Rome Film Festival where it won huge appreciation from the audience and critics alike. In 2011, the film was played at several film festivals in India and China, receiving unanimous applause and praise, as well as winning a number of awards.

Plot
The film begins with a man waking up in decrepit old house in an unknown area. He gets a call from his wife inquiring where he is. Unaware of his location, he searches the house for a cigarette. He accidentally opens a room and finds it filled with Russian soldiers. One of them starts chasing him and opens fire at him. He gets shot in the leg and jumps into a bathtub he finds in the snow.
The man wakes up in a bathtub. He is revealed to be K (John Abraham), a wealthy businessman in his 30s. He is confident, narcissistic and very arrogant, and also completely addicted to smoking. He smokes almost constantly - at work, at home, even in the bath and while having sex. His friends and family beg him to quit, but to no avail. K's friend Abbas (Ranvir Shorey) and his doctor (Kiku Sharda), offer to set up an appointment at a rehabilitation centre called 'Prayogshaala' ('The Laboratory'), which they claim will surely rid K of his habit. K finally relents after his wife Anjali (Ayesha Takia) leaves him, unable to take the strain K's smoking addiction places on their relationship.

K decides to check out Prayogshaala, and meets Shri Shri Prakash Guru Ghantal Baba Bengali Sealdahwale (Paresh Rawal). The centre operates behind the front of another business, 'Kalkatta Karpets'. K finds the building to be unconventional and confusing, similar to a Labyrinth. The method Prayogshaala uses to cure their patients of their addiction is based on fear and psychological manipulation. Each time a patient gives in to their vice, Baba makes sure that something shocking happens to them.

 Almost killing a loved one, by keeping him / her in a chamber full of cigarette smoke the person has smoked in his entire life, for a duration of 5 minutes.
 Losing a finger.
 Death of a loved one.
 Taking the soul of the person from his body, although this offense is described very loosely.

K initially refuses to sign the contract and pay the fee of 21,11,110 for his treatment but is forced to do so by Baba and his disciples. Baba then tells K that he is free to leave, but he must abide by the rules or he will suffer the consequences. K witnesses other members of the group as they try to quit smoking. Many end up losing fingers as they cannot resist the urge to smoke. K tries to keep to the terms but fails twice and is punished. He is now very conscious about the third time.

After some time, K meets an old friend, Alex, who is now a Cuban cigar seller. At an event, K is forced to place a cigar in his mouth, in order to appease his friend. Seconds later, he receives a phone call from the police, who inform him that his wife is missing and possibly dead. He calls Baba and is told that for smoking, his wife will be killed, as per the rules. He protests that he did not actually smoke and Baba apologizes for the mistake, but says it is too late. K asks Baba to tell the police about this, but the line goes dead and the phone number is non-existent on dialling. K's protests are ignored and the police believe that he is delusional. Trying to prove his story, he seeks out Abbas, who had lost a finger at the rehabilitation centre, only to find that the man has all fingers intact. Mocking him, the police force K to smoke. Shortly afterwards, K gets a phone call that his brother committed suicide due to his smoking habit. K raves angrily at the police and is thrown in the jail.

K is eventually bailed out. Soon, he learns that Baba permits sins and vices to be done during a period known as 'Zero Minute'. He attends an event, where he sees Baba, but is unable to reach him. K decides to light a cigarette. Suddenly, K wakes up in a Russian army base, with a call from his wife. She asks him why he believes she is dead. K is confused, but escapes from the base by jumping into water and ends up in a ragged room, from which he sees himself staring out from a hospital room. He also sees his wife and Baba. He calls out but no one can hear him, and he is told that it is because his body no longer hears his inner soul. The final punishment is complete.

In a series of haphazard events, the twisted path of K's soul is shown, until it finally reaches his body once again. K wakes up in his home to find his wife sleeping near him. He also discovers that he is missing two fingers. Later, K is seen recommending the "Prayogshala" centre to a friend.

Cast
 John Abraham as K, a self-obsessed, smart aleck, narcissist, chain smoker who agrees to quit smoking for his wife, but is caught up in the game of Baba Bengali in the process, after he refuses to co-operate.
 Ayesha Takia as Anjali / Annie, the wife of K, who is fed up of his habit and forcefully tries to make him quit by threatening to leave him. Annie is the secretary of K, who seems to have a crush on him and looks exactly the same as Anjali. Throughout the movie, it is implied she happens to be both Annie and Anjali as K liked spreading rumors in the office about their affairs.
 Paresh Rawal as Shri Shri Prakash Guru Ghantal Baba Bengali Sealdahwale, the film's main antagonist, who is extremely mysterious, yet very clever and powerful. He forcefully makes people quit smoking, otherwise bad things keep on happening in their lives. He knows at all times if someone is breaking his agreement, even if they are in another country, or no man's land.
 Ranvir Shorey as Abbas Tyerwalla, the friend of K, who was also the one to introduce him to smoking. He recommends the Prayogshala (Laboratory) to K, as he himself had to learn to quit smoking from Baba Bengali.
 Kiku Sharda as the doctor and another friend of K, who learnt to quit smoking from Baba Bengali.
 Joy Fernandes as Alex
 Rasika Dugal in a character role
 Anurag Kashyap as man in the elevator (uncredited)
 Vikramaditya Motwane as an employee in K's office
 Gajraj Rao as drunk man outside the restaurant.
 Jesse Randhawa in a special appearance as a dancer in the song "Jab Bhi Cigarette"
 Bipasha Basu in an Item number "Phook De" (during the closing credits)

Production

Development
The idea for the film came during the making of Satya (1998), when director Ram Gopal Varma pitched a story about a chain smoker's encounter with someone who despises smoking. Varma later incorporated his own idea of the story as a short segment in his anthology film, Darna Mana Hai (2003). During the shooting of Kashyap's Black Friday, his assistant narrated him a different script about a chain smoker who wakes up without cigarettes and is unable to get any because of a curfew. Kashyap decided to take the story forward, taking inspiration from Quitters, Inc. and a surreal moment from Cats Eye, subsequently making him develop the story into a darker and more unreal version.

Casting
After the scripting was complete in 2006, Kashyap narrated the film to Shah Rukh Khan, who was keen to do the film but later would back out for unknown reasons. When the deal fell through Kashyap who was in bad shape at the time, as one of his films were delayed and the other stuck in production, he tried to get a hold of all the top actors, though none of them responded except for Abraham. Vishal Bhardwaj, Kashyap's friend and producer of the film recommended Saif Ali Khan, as he was part of the smoking segment in Darna Mana Hai, though Kashyap had already finalised Abraham. Later false reports surfaced that Saif will be appearing in a cameo, on the request of co-producer Kumar Mangat, who worked together in Omkara (2006).

Due to the film having a complex storyline, when Kashyap was auditioning Abraham, he read him a badly written fake script titled Lapata (Lost), which Abraham declined to. After which he read him the real script of No Smoking, he immediately agreed to do it. Initially Takia was not comfortable with the love making scenes and the clothes of the secretary (Annie), though Kashyap refused to make any changes. There is also a scene where Abraham is seen nude from rear, this stirred up some controversy. Abraham who had previously quit smoking, smoked up to 90 cigarettes a day during the shooting to give the film a more believable look. Later when the film was complete, Abraham went for an X-ray and found his lungs were heavily damaged.

Originally director Rajkumar Santoshi was set to make his acting debut by playing the role of the doctor, and writer Abbas Tyrewala was to play the role later given to Shorey, hence Kashyap named the character after the writer.

Filming
Most of the filming was done in unique ways. In one scene where Abraham and Shorey are seen as teenagers smoking Marijuana, most directors would have used child actors but Kashyap decided instead to alter the appearance of the actors and make them improvise and behave as kids themselves.

The film was also shot in parts of the Russian Federation, Kazakhstan, Uzbekistan and Siberia, in extremely cold climates with temperatures of minus 25 degrees Celsius (°C), despite this none of the crew members had any problems during the shooting. During the shooting in Uzbekistan, a Russian actor dressed as a soldier had to chase Abraham. After running 200 meters the man collapsed, as the shooting was on high altitudes, there was a lack of oxygen. He had to be rushed to the hospital, as he had stopped breathing.

Reception

Critical reception

India
The film was heavily panned by Indian critics. Sify gave it 2 out of 5 stars saying "You try so hard to understand what No Smoking tries to say, but the film is like one big puzzle that refuses to get solved. John makes a sincere attempt to leave a mark and succeeds to an extent. Really, one wonders, what prompted John to instantly approve this bizarre story". Rajeev Masand of IBN Live giving it 1.5/5 said "What the director gives us is an extremely arrogant piece of work that reeks of over-confidence and self-proclaimed genius. How else do you explain the intentionally incohesive screenplay, the bizarre dialogue, and the blatant disregard for the viewer's time and patience?". Nikhat Kazmi of Times of India also gave it 1.5/5 stars and said "No Smoking leaves you completely baffled and desperately looking for logic in its surreal sequences of John in a jaded jail, John in a tunnel, John in a bathtub, John in Siberia-like surroundings". Indu Mirani from DNA India rated it 1.5/5 saying "There is a fine line between intelligence and indulgence and with No Smoking, director Anurag Kashyap crosses it often. It’s not like he has made a rank bad film, but 'No Smoking' is so influenced by graphic novels and Neil Gaiman books, that understanding its plot's many forward and backward movements would be out of the scope of the layman". Khalid Mohamed of Hindustan Times rated it 1 star and said "Too in-depth man, too in-depth, puffing, driving, the sex act, fingers being chopped. Kcuf, kcuf. What’s happening out here? You can’t make out, you don’t care, and you’re fed up of the affectations, the self-indulgence." Taran Adarsh from Bollywood Hungama giving it 1 out of 5 said "You try so hard to understand what No Smoking tries to say, but the film is like one big puzzle that refuses to get solved. What ails No Smoking, did you ask. Simple, it's the most complicated cinematic experience of 2007. On the whole, No Smoking fails miserably. Very disappointing!". Prithviraj Hegde of Rediff.com gave the film 0 stars and said "The movie unfolds like a bad dream and spins into a downward spiral that's unreal, incomprehensible and leaves you dazed. And as you may have gathered, I still have no clue what the movie was about." On the contrary, Chandril Bhattacharya of Anandabazar Patrika praised the movie uninhibitedly and described the film as first of its kind in India and historical. Aesthetically and culturally significant, it is extremely unfortunate No Smoking was not sent as India’s official selection at the Oscars for Best Foreign Language film. Instead, in 2012 No Smoking was voted no. 2 on the list of: "The Ten Worst Films of John Abraham" by Rediff.com.

Overseas
On Rotten Tomatoes website, the film has received 46% fresh rating, indicating mixed reviews. Phelim O'Neill of The Guardian gave it 3 out of 5 saying "While no screen credit is offered to King, it's clear his tale directly forms this film's basis, making it kind of a first for Indian cinema. It could be the beginning of a trend. While a slack pace, unsettled internal logic and a goofy subplot undo much of director Kashyap's hard work. Film 4 also rated it 3 out of 5 stars and said "Those whose concept of Bollywood involves elephants, saris and dance numbers might be pleasantly surprised by Anurag Kashyap's film, a slick thriller that combines a screwball sensibility with a nightmarish twist". Tajpal Rathore from BBC Films gave it 1 out of 5 and said "No Smoking is a surprisingly sincere effort, but shouldn't make your life feel any more fulfilled, even if you are a smoker. The shoddy screenplay is stale, and its situations laughable, and though the actors' give it their all, it just doesn't light up in the end. No smoke, and no fire, in what is ultimately a bit of a drag".

Box office
The film was screened in private a day before its release, as most of the audience could not decipher the film, they left, which resulted in a negative word of the mouth spreading. The film was further affected from negative critical reception. No Smoking opened to a poor response at the box office, and was one of the biggest disasters of the year.

Awards
53rd Filmfare Awards
 Nominated: Filmfare Award for Best Art Direction - Wasiq Khan
 Nominated: Filmfare Award for Best Cinematographer - Rajeev Ravi
 Nominated: Filmfare Award for Best Special Effects - Sudeepto Bose

Impact and legacy

The film was made on huge budget and at the time when it sank at the box office, the director Kashyap fell into depression not expecting the critics to lash at it. He admitted that most of the audience expected to see a film about quitting smoking and that pre-release, the extensively played item song featuring Basu gave audience the wrong type of image as they expected her to play the lead role opposite Abraham. In 2011, Kashyap stated that No Smoking was his favourite, of all his films.

No Smoking has garnered a strong cult following, among Kashyap's fans and movie buffs, who rate it as one of the most abstract stories, which can have multiple interpretations. The film has seen more positive response from overseas than in India, though the audience now views it as a modern masterpiece, critical reception has still not improved. It is often compared to the films of Hollywood director David Lynch, who is known for his cult surrealistic films.

No Smoking has been played at several Film festivals. It was played at the Indian film festival and won multiple awards, after being repeatedly screened. The film was also played at various venues in Beijing (China) and Rome.

Interpretations
No Smoking is notable as being the only Bollywood film which can have multiple interpretations. Kashyap explained that the film has nothing to do with quitting smoking but relatively about the state of mind, which refers to the mood or the mental state of the film's protagonist, K. He has left it upon the audience themselves to make their own interpretations and speculate what transpires. There are many unofficial blogs on the internet by fans trying to solve the film's meaning.

Soundtrack

The official soundtrack was composed by Vishal Bhardwaj who also co-produced the film. Background Score was done by Hitesh Sonik & Clinton Cerejo. The lyrics were penned by Gulzar. The music rights were sold to Eros Entertainment and were released in September 2007. The album is available to download from iTunes.

Track listing

Reception
The soundtrack album received critical acclaim. Abhishek Singh from Planet Bollywood said "Over all, as expected, the music turns out to be daringly different and in complete contrast to anything that you might have ever listened. Almost all the songs carry the message of the film along and for that reason only, one can’t be sure of this album on a stand alone basis but seen alongside the concept of the movie, it sure hits the bulls eye". Joginder Tuteja from India Fm said "With music by Vishal Bhardwaj and lyrics by Gulzar saab, one expects an unconventional soundtrack in the offering. Well, unconventional it is and in at least a couple of places, exciting too! This has to be one of the most original tracks ever written. 'Jab Bhi Cigarette' is the opening song of the album and may well be termed as the title song of the album". Satyajit from Glamsham said "No Smoking dares to be different for chartering unexplored territories and have surprises in raucously driven vivacious tracks like "Phoonk De" and "Jab Bhi Cigarette". Rekha Bhardwaj's peculiar nasal twang will be garnering major spotlight in "Phoonk De" (club mix) with chartbusting success after her subtle and submissive Laaga Chunari Mein Daag".

References

External links
 
 

2007 films
2007 psychological thriller films
2000s Hindi-language films
Smoking cessation
Films directed by Anurag Kashyap
Indian neo-noir films
Films based on short fiction
Films shot in Kazakhstan
Films shot in Russia
Films shot in Uzbekistan
Films scored by Vishal Bhardwaj
Indian psychological thriller films
Films with screenplays by Anurag Kashyap
Films based on works by Stephen King
Films shot in Siberia